Anolis haguei, Hague's anole, is a species of lizard in the family Dactyloidae. The species is found in Guatemala.

References

Anoles
Endemic fauna of Guatemala
Reptiles of Guatemala
Reptiles described in 1942
Taxa named by Laurence Cooper Stuart